José María Colorado (born January 22, 1956 in Puerto Real) is a Spanish sport shooter. He competed at the 1992 Summer Olympics in the mixed skeet event, in which he placed fifth.

References

1956 births
Living people
Skeet shooters
Spanish male sport shooters
Shooters at the 1992 Summer Olympics
Olympic shooters of Spain
20th-century Spanish people